Jean Carlos Enrique Segura (born March 17, 1990), nicknamed El Mambo, is a Dominican professional baseball shortstop and second baseman for the Miami Marlins of Major League Baseball (MLB). He has previously played in MLB for the Los Angeles Angels of Anaheim, Milwaukee Brewers, Arizona Diamondbacks, Seattle Mariners, and Philadelphia Phillies. Segura was an All-Star in 2013 and 2018, and led the National League in hits in 2016. He played for the Dominican Republic national baseball team at the 2017 World Baseball Classic.

Segura signed with the Angels as a free agent in 2007. He made his MLB debut with the Angels in 2012 and was traded to the Brewers as part of a package for Zack Greinke. He played for Milwaukee through 2015, when he was traded to the Diamondbacks. Arizona traded him to Seattle after the 2016 season, and he signed a five-year, $70 million contract with the Mariners in 2017. After the 2018 season, Seattle traded Segura to Philadelphia.

Professional career

Los Angeles Angels
Segura was born in San Juan, Dominican Republic. He signed with the Los Angeles Angels of Anaheim as an international free agent in 2007. 

He made his professional debut with the Dominican Summer Angels of the Rookie-level Dominican Summer League in 2007. Segura batted .324/.392/.393 with 22 stolen bases and seven sacrifice hits (seventh in the league) in 219 at-bats, and was named a DSL postseason All-Star. He played 11 games for the Arizona Angels of the Rookie-level Arizona League in 2008, and fractured his left leg. 

In 2009 Segura played for the Orem Owlz of the Rookie-level Pioneer League, and also played in five games for the Salt Lake Bees of the Class AAA Pacific Coast League, batting .354/.395/.514 with 11 stolen bases in 181 at bats between the two teams. His season was limited by a broken finger on his right hand. He had a 22-game hitting streak with the Owlz, one short of the franchise record, and while playing for them was tied for 8th in the Pioneer League in triples (4), and 8th in batting average (.346).

In 2010, Segura played for the Cedar Rapids Kernels of the Class A Midwest League, where he had a standout year, as he was the May 24 Midwest League Player of the Week and stole 50 bases (leading the league) with 161 hits (also leading the league) and hit 12 triples (2nd in the league), 10 home runs and 24 doubles, while recording 11 sacrifice hits (3rd), 89 runs (4th), 79 runs batted in (RBIs) (7th), and batting .313 (10th). He was named a Midwest League mid-season All-Star, and an MiLB.com Angels Organization All-Star. He was promoted to the Inland Empire 66ers of the Class A-Advanced California League in 2011, but missed a significant portion of the season after suffering a torn left hamstring and only played in 44 games for the team, batting .281/.337/.422 with 18 stolen bases in 185 at-bats.

Segura was added to the Angels 40-man roster on November 18, 2011. He played for the Arkansas Travelers of the Class AA Texas League in 2012. After batting .287 with 25 stolen bases in his first 69 games of the season, he was named to appear in the 2012 All-Star Futures Game. For the season in AA, he batted .304/.358/.413 with 37 stolen bases in 404 at-bats. He was 4th in the Texas League in stolen bases (33), tied for 8th in sacrifice hits (6), and 9th in triples (5). He was named a mid-season Texas League All-Star, and was again named an MiLB.com Angels Organization All-Star. On July 24, 2012, he made his MLB debut at shortstop.

Milwaukee Brewers
After playing in only one game for the Angels, he was traded to the Milwaukee Brewers along with John Hellweg and Ariel Peña for Zack Greinke on July 27, 2012. The Brewers assigned him to the Huntsville Stars of the Class AA Southern League and promoted him on August 6 after he batted 13-for-30 in eight games with the club. He batted .264/.321/.331	 with seven stolen bases and 14 RBIs in 148 at-bats with the Brewers.

In the offseason, Segura played in the Dominican Winter League, and won the league's batting title with a .324 batting average, as he was also 2nd in the league with 11 stolen bases. He was named the Brewers' Opening Day shortstop in 2013. He was a National League reserve for the 2013 MLB All-Star Game. He won the Player of the Week Award on May 12 and finished the year hitting .294/.329/.423 with 10 triples and 44 stolen bases (each 2nd in the NL), 12 home runs, an 18.9 power–speed number (9th in the league), and 7.0 at bats per strikeout (10th-lowest) in 588 at-bats. At the same time, his walk percentage of 4.0% was tied for the 6th-lowest in major league baseball.

In 2014 he batted .246/.289/.326 with 7.3 at-bats per strikeout (7th-lowest), and 10 sacrifice hits (10th in the league) in 513 at-bats. On defense. Segura led all NL fielders with 447 assists. 

In 2015 Segura batted .257/.281/.336 with 25 stolen bases (5th in the NL), and an 80.65% stolen base percentage (10th) in 560 at-bats. He walked in 2.2% of his at-bats, the lowest percentage in the major leagues, and had the lowest walks-per-strikeout ratio in the majors (0.14).

"Stealing first base"

In the eighth inning of a game on April 19, 2013, Segura stole second base, and then "stole" first base, then was thrown out trying to again steal second base. After Segura singled and stole second, and Ryan Braun walked, Segura and Braun attempted a double steal. However, Segura retreated to second after the pitcher Shawn Camp threw to third base instead of pitching. With both Segura and Braun standing on second base, both were tagged, and by baseball's rules, it was Braun who was out. However, Segura thought that he himself was out and began to head back to the Brewers' dugout (which happened to be on the first-base side of the field), until first base coach Garth Iorg instructed Segura to stand on first base, where he was ruled safe. Two pitches later, Segura was caught stealing second base.

The play resulted in much confusion regarding whether Segura should have been allowed to retreat to first base after he had legitimately occupied second base. The umpires allowed it under a rule that specifies only that a player may not retreat if the intent is to "confuse the defense or make a travesty of the game," as Segura was doing no such thing but was simply confused. MLB later declared that the ruling on the field was wrong, as a rule forbidding a player from reaching a base after "abandoning the effort" at baserunning should have superseded the rule invoked when calling him safe, and that Segura should have been called out at first base.

Because the usual methods of reporting baseball play-by-play do not allow for a runner on second to retreat to first base, some records of the game indicate that Segura remained on second and was thrown out trying to steal third base, though this is not what occurred.

Arizona Diamondbacks

On January 30, 2016, the Brewers traded Segura and Tyler Wagner to the Arizona Diamondbacks in exchange for Aaron Hill, Chase Anderson, Isan Diaz, and cash considerations. In 153 games in 2016, most of which he played at second base--for the first time in the majors--Segura batted .319 batting average (5th in the National League)/.368 (a career best)/.499, with an NL-leading 203 hits, 135 singles (2nd), a 24.9 power-speed # (4th), 41 doubles and 33 stolen bases (each, 5th), 102 runs (7th), 7 triples (8th), and 20 home runs, while on defense leading all NL players in assists with 428. He came in 13th in the voting for NL MVP.

Seattle Mariners
On November 23, 2016, the Diamondbacks traded Segura, Zac Curtis, and Mitch Haniger to the Seattle Mariners for Taijuan Walker and Ketel Marte.

In June 2017, Segura signed a five-year contract extension with Seattle worth $70 million. The contract covers the years 2018 to 2022, and has a $17 million option for 2023, with a $1 million buyout. He returned to shortstop and ended the season batting .300/.349/.427 with 22 stolen bases in 125 games.

In 2018, while batting .329 mid-season, he was named to the 2018 MLB All-Star Game, in which he hit a go-ahead 3-run home run off of Josh Hader in the 8th inning.  For the season Segura batted .304 (7th in the AL)/.341/.415, with 136 singles (leading the majors), 178 hits (6th), and 20 stolen bases while striking out once every 8.5 at-bats (5th-fewest), as on defense he was 3rd in the AL in assists with 387. He had the 4th-lowest whiff rate (12.6%; missing on just 136 of his 1,080 swings) among all qualified hitters, and the 9th-best contact rate (48.8%; 527 of his 1,080 swings were put in play), and led all major league batters in 3-hit games (20) and tied for first in infield hits (36). He became one of only four MLB batters with a .300 or better batting average over the last three years, along with José Altuve, Freddie Freeman, and Mike Trout. He and Starling Marté were the only two MLB players to have stolen 20 or more bases each season since 2013. Over his two seasons with the Mariners he batted a combined .302/.345/.421 as Seattle’s shortstop. Among regulars at shortstop in those two years, his 112 OPS+ ranked 4th behind Francisco Lindor, Xander Bogaerts, and Didi Gregorius.

Philadelphia Phillies
On December 3, 2018, the Mariners traded Segura, Juan Nicasio, and James Pazos to the Philadelphia Phillies for Carlos Santana and J. P. Crawford. Segura waived the no-trade clause in his contract to allow the trade to take place.

In 2019, Segura batted .280/.323/.420 with 79 runs, 37 doubles (8th in the National League), 12 home runs, 60 RBIs, and 10 stolen bases in 576 at-bats. He made contact with the highest percentage of pitches he swung at in the strike zone (94.3%) of all NL batters. He had 7.9 strikeouts-per-at-bat, second-best in the National League, and on defense, his 20 errors were tops in the league and his 83 double plays were fourth-most among NL shortstops.

In the pandemic-shortened 2020 season, Segura batted .266/.347/.422 with 7 home runs and 25 RBIs in 54 games.

In 2021, Segura batted .290/.348/.436 with 14 home runs, 58 RBIs, and 9 stolen bases in 131 games. He led all NL second basemen with 85 double plays and a 4.66 range factor.

On June 1, 2022, Segura was placed on the injured list after suffering a fractured right index finger, an injury that came with a recovery timetable of 10-12 weeks. In 2022 he batted .277/.336/.387 in 354 at-bats, with 10 home runs and 33 RBIs. He stole 13 bases and was sixth in the NL in caught stealing (6), and ninth in double plays grounded into (16).

On November 7, 2022, the Phillies declined Segura's $17 million club option, making him a free agent for the first time in his career.

Miami Marlins
On January 4, 2023, Segura signed a two-year, $17 million contract with the Miami Marlins.

Personal life
Segura is married to wife Kellen with two sons. He had a son from a previous relationship who died in 2014 aged nine months, which nearly caused Segura to quit baseball.

References

External links

Jean Segura at SABR (Baseball BioProject)

1990 births
Living people
American League All-Stars
Arizona Diamondbacks players
Arizona League Angels players
Arkansas Travelers players
Cedar Rapids Kernels players
Dominican Republic expatriate baseball players in the United States
Dominican Summer Angels players
Dominican Summer League Angels players
Gigantes del Cibao players
Huntsville Stars players
Inland Empire 66ers of San Bernardino players
Los Angeles Angels players
Major League Baseball shortstops
Major League Baseball players from the Dominican Republic
Milwaukee Brewers players
National League All-Stars
Orem Owlz players
People from San Juan Province (Dominican Republic)
Philadelphia Phillies players
Salt Lake Bees players
Scottsdale Scorpions players
Seattle Mariners players
Tacoma Rainiers players
World Baseball Classic players of the Dominican Republic
2017 World Baseball Classic players